Social statistics is the use of statistical measurement systems to study human behavior in a social environment.  This can be accomplished through polling a group of people, evaluating a subset of data obtained about a group of people, or by observation and statistical analysis of a set of data that relates to people and their behaviors.

Statistics in the social sciences

History

Adolph Quetelet was a proponent of social physics. In his book Physique sociale he presents distributions of human heights, age of marriage, time of birth and death, time series of human marriages, births and deaths, a survival density for humans and curve describing fecundity as a function of age. He also developed the Quetelet Index.

Francis Ysidro Edgeworth published "On Methods of Ascertaining Variations in the Rate of Births, Deaths, and Marriages" in 1885 which uses squares of differences for studying fluctuations and George Udny Yule published "On the Correlation of total Pauperism with Proportion of Out-Relief" in 1895.

A numerical calibration for the fertility curve was given by Karl Pearson in 1897 in his "The Chances of Death, and Other Studies in Evolution" In this book Pearson also uses standard deviation, correlation and skewness for studying humans.

Vilfredo Pareto published his analysis of the distribution of income in Great Britain and Ireland in 1897, this is now known as the Pareto principle.

Louis Guttman proposed that the values of ordinal variables can be represented by a Guttman scale, which is useful if the number of variables is large and allows the use of techniques such as ordinary least squares.

Macroeconomic statistical research has provided stylized facts, which include:
 Bowley's law (1937) regarding the proportion between wages and national output 
 The Phillips curve (1958) regarding the relation between wages and unemployment

Statistics and statistical analyses have become a key feature of social science: statistics is employed in economics, psychology, political science, sociology and anthropology.

Statistical methods in social sciences

Methods and concepts used in quantitative social sciences include:
 Research design, survey methodology and survey sampling
 Delphi method

Statistical techniques include:

Covariance based methods

 Regression analysis
 Canonical correlation
 Causal analysis
 Multilevel models
 Factor analysis
 Linear discriminant analysis
 Path analysis
 Structural Equation Modeling

Probability based methods

 Probit and logit
 Item response theory
 Bayesian statistics
 Stochastic process
 Latent class model

Distance based methods

 Cluster analysis
 Multidimensional scaling

Methods for categorical data

 Classification analysis
 Cohort analysis

Usage and applications 

Social scientists use social statistics for many purposes, including:
 the evaluation of the quality of services available to a group or organization,
 analyzing behaviors of groups of people in their environment and special situations,
 determining the wants of people through statistical sampling
 evaluation of wage expenditures and savings
 preventing industrial diseases
 prevention of industrial accidents
 labour disputes, such as supporting the Anthracite Coal Strike Commission of 1902-1903
 supporting governments in times of peace and war

Reliability

The use of statistics has become so widespread in the social sciences that many universities such as Harvard, have developed institutes focusing on "quantitative social science." Harvard's Institute for Quantitative Social Science focuses mainly on fields like political science that incorporate the advanced causal statistical models that Bayesian methods provide. However, some experts in causality feel that these claims of causal statistics are overstated. There is a debate regarding the uses and value of statistical methods in social science, especially in political science, with some statisticians questioning practices such as data dredging that can lead to  unreliable policy conclusions of political partisans who overestimate the interpretive power that non-robust statistical methods such as simple and multiple linear regression allow. Indeed, an important axiom that social scientists cite, but often forget, is that "correlation does not imply causation." For example, it appears widely accepted that the lower numbers of women in decision-making positions in politics, business and science is good evidence of gender discrimination. But where men suffer adverse statistical indicators such as greater imprisonment rates or a higher suicide rate, that is not usually accepted as evidence of gender bias acting against them.

Further reading

Irvine, John, Miles, Ian, Evans, Jeff, (editors), "Demystifying Social Statistics ", London : Pluto Press, 1979.

References

External links

Social science statistics centers
Center for Statistics and Social Sciences, University of Washington
Center for the Promotion of Research Involving Innovative Statistical Methodology, New York University, NY
Centre for Research Methods, Faculty of Social Sciences, University of Helsinki, Finland
Cornell Institute for Social and Economic Research
Harvard Institute for Quantitative Social Science
Inter-University Consortium for Political and Social Research
National Centre for Research Methods, UK
Social Statistics Department, University of Manchester
Social Statistics Division, School of Social Sciences, University of Southampton, UK

Statistical databases for social science
Inter-University Consortium for Political and Social Research
UN Statistics Division- Demographic and Social Statistics
Organisation for Economic Co-Operation and Development (OECD)
US Bureau of Labor Statistics
International Labour Organisation- LABORSTA
Unionstats.com